Acsis, Inc. is an American software company that specializes in enterprise software providing end-to-end supply chain traceability. In February 2022 ACSIS was acquired by the Italian company, Antares Vision Group.

Company overview
Headquartered in Marlton, New Jersey, Acsis is a privately held company whose primary shareholder is the private equity firm Saints Capital. Acsis has 1,000+ customers, 24/7 phone support, and over 1,100 implementations in 30 countries.

Company history
The company founded in 1996 as a spin-off of ARMS, was created to focus on the market trend in barcode and data collection solutions. Acquired in 2005 by Safeguard Scientifics, Inc., a publicly traded company located in Wayne, Pennsylvania. In 2008, Acsis, Inc. was acquired by Saints Capital.

In February 2022 Acsis was acquired by the Italian company Antares Vision.

References

External links
 Press Release: Logistics Week - April 2011

Companies based in Burlington County, New Jersey
Software companies established in 1996
Privately held companies based in New Jersey
ERP software companies
Evesham Township, New Jersey